Punctapinella paraconchitis is a species of moth of the family Tortricidae. It is found in Ecuador in Sucumbíos and Zamora-Chinchipe provinces.

The wingspan is 22 mm. The ground colour of the forewings is snow white with grey subterminal shades. The markings are grey with black marks. The hindwings are cream brown, tinged with ochreous on the periphery.

Etymology
The species name refers to similarity with Punctapinella conchitis plus the Latin prefix para (meaning near, close).

References

Moths described in 2008
Euliini